John or Johnny Ryan may refer to:

Business
John Ryan (businessman) (born 1950), pioneer of cosmetic surgery and chairman of Doncaster Rovers
John D. Ryan (industrialist) (1864–1933), American copper mining magnate
John Ryan (printer) (1761–1847), "father of the press in British North America"
John J. "Bald Jack" Ryan, American businessman
John P. Ryan (mining executive), CEO of US Silver Corporation

Media, arts and entertainment
John Ryan (cartoonist) (1921–2009), British animator and cartoonist
John Joseph Patrick Ryan, real name of American actor Jack Lord
John P. Ryan (1936–2007), American film actor
John Saint Ryan (born 1953), British actor and equestrian
Johnny Ryan (born 1970), American alternative comics creator and cartoonist
John Ryan (musician) (born 1987), American singer-songwriter and record producer
John Ryan (producer) (1928–2010), Canadian movie and TV producer; see On the 2nd Day of Christmas

Military
John Ryan (VC 1857) (1823–1858), Irish recipient of the Victoria Cross
John Ryan (VC 1863) (1839–1863), Irish recipient of the Victoria Cross
John Ryan (Australian soldier) (1890–1941), Australian recipient of the Victoria Cross
John Dale Ryan (1915–1983), general in the United States Air Force
John R. Ryan (born 1945), chancellor of SUNY, former superintendent, the United States Naval Academy

Politics
John Ryan (British politician) (1940–2002), British Labour Member of Parliament
John Ryan (Irish politician) (1927–2014), Irish Labour Party politician
John Ryan (New South Wales politician) (born 1956), Legislative Council Member
John Ryan (South Australian politician) (1911–1988), House of Assembly member and Speaker
John Ryan (Australian politician) (1890–1974), Australian Senator
John Ryan (New Mexico politician), American state legislator in New Mexico
John F. Ryan (1848–1936), Virginia politician
John Henry Ryan, Washington legislator and businessman
John Nagel Ryan (1816–1887), New South Wales politician
John P. Ryan (New York politician), American businessman and politician from New York

Sports

Association football (soccer)
John Ryan (footballer, born 1930) (1930–2008), Scottish football player
John Ryan (footballer, born 1947) (born 1947), English football player and manager
John Ryan (footballer, born 1962), English football player 
John Ryan (footballer, born 1968), Irish football player
John Ryan (footballer, born 2004), Irish football player

Baseball
Johnny Ryan (baseball) (1853–1902), American baseball player
John Ryan (pitcher) (fl. 1880s), American baseball player
Blondy Ryan (John Collins Ryan, 1906–1959), American baseball shortstop

Hurling
John Ryan (Dublin hurler), Dublin hurler of the 1910s
Johnny Ryan (hurler, born 1914) (1914–1997), Tipperary hurler of the 1930s-40s
John Ryan (Galway hurler) (1958–2003), Irish hurler
Johnny Ryan (hurler, born 1988), Tipperary hurler of the 2010s

Rugby
John Ryan (rugby union coach) (1939–2022), Welsh rugby union coach
John Ryan (rugby, born 1948) (1948–1982), Australian rugby union and rugby league player
John Ryan (rugby union, born 1988), Irish rugby union player

Other sports
John Ryan (jockey); Jockey who competed in the 1859 Grand National
John J. Ryan (1886–1950), American college football coach at Marquette University and the University of Wisconsin
John Ryan (runner) (1893–1963), Irish Olympic distance runner
John Ryan (Australian rules footballer) (1909–1989), Australian rules footballer for Essendon and Fitzroy
John Ryan (judoka) (born 1934), Irish judoka
Johnny Ryan (Australian footballer) (born 1938), Australian rules footballer for Richmond
John Ryan (swimmer) (born 1944), Australian Olympic swimmer
Jon Ryan (born 1981), Canadian football punter

Writers
John Ryan (artist) (1925–1993), Irish artist, broadcaster, publisher, critic, editor, patron and publican
John Ryan (publisher) (born 1967), Irish journalist and publisher

Other
John A. Ryan (1869–1945), American Roman Catholic social reformer, economist and writer
Jack Ryan (FBI agent) (John C. Ryan, born 1938), former FBI agent
John Ryan (diplomat) (1923–1987), Australian diplomat and director-general of ASIS
John M. Ryan (born 1949), American attorney
John W. Ryan (1929–2011), president of Indiana University
John Alphonsus Ryan (born 1952), Irish Catholic bishop and academic
John Ryan (bishop), Irish Roman Catholic bishop

See also
Jack Ryan (disambiguation)